Knox Chandler is an American musician known primarily as a guitarist, though he also plays cello, keyboards and other instruments. He has worked extensively as a session musician. In the early to mid-1970s, Chandler attended the Hammonasset School and Bard College.

Chandler worked with  Depeche Mode, Lori Carson, The Golden Palominos, the Psychedelic Furs, Ultra Vivid Scene, Maggie Estep, the Creatures and R.E.M. He was also the touring guitarist for Siouxsie and the Banshees in 1995 and in 2002 for the Seven Year Itch tour. He also toured with Cyndi Lauper and Lou Reed.

Chandler collaborated with Dave Gahan on his solo album Paper Monsters, and played guitar during Gahan's 2003 Paper Monsters Tour in support of the album.

He now lives in Berlin and is a teacher.

References

External links 
 
 

Living people
American rock guitarists
American male guitarists
American cellists
Siouxsie and the Banshees members
The Golden Palominos members
American session musicians
Year of birth missing (living people)